The Loma people, sometimes called Loghoma, Looma, Lorma or Toma, are a West African ethnic group living primarily in mountainous, sparsely populated regions near the border between Guinea and Liberia. Their population was estimated at 330,000 in the two countries in 2010. They are closely related to the Mende people.

The Loma speak a language in the Southwestern branch of the Mande languages, belonging to the Niger-Congo family of languages. The language is similar to the Kpelle, Mende, Gola, Vai, and Bandi languages. The Loma refer to their language as Löömàgòòi  or Löghömàgòòi ). The Loma people, led by Wido Zobo and assisted by a Loma weaver named Moriba, developed a writing script for their language in the 1930s. This writing script contains at least 185 characters.

The Mandinka, Koniaka, and Kissi refer to the Loma as Toma. Loma refer to themselves as Löömàgìtì (or Löghömagiti  in Guinea). They have retained their Traditional Religion, and resisted the Islamic jihads. The Loma people called the religious conflict with Mandinka people as a historic 'rolling war'.

The Loma people are notable for their large wooden masks that merge syncretic animal and human motifs. These masks have been a part of their Poro secret rites of passage. The largest masks are about six feet high, contain feather decorations and believed by Loma to have forest spirits.

The Loma people farm rice, but in shifting farms. They are exogamous people, with patrilineal social organization in matters related to inheritance, succession and lineage affiliations with one-marriage rule. Joint families, or virilocal communities are common, wherein families of brothers settle close to each other.

The Loma people are also referred to as Buzi, Buzzi, Logoma, Toale, Toali, Toa, or Tooma.

Loma patronyms

Notable Loma people 
Louis Lansana Béavogui, former prime minister of Guinea from 1972 to 1984
Joshua Guilavogui, French footballer
K. Guilavogui, Guinean politician
Michel Guilavogui, Guinean footballer
Mohamed Guilavogui, Malian footballer
Morgan Guilavogui, French footballer
Pépé Guilavogui, Guinean footballer
 Simon Falette
Balla Onivogui, Guinean trumpet player
 Mohamed Simakan

References

External links
Ethnologue report for Loma language
Omniglot: Loma syllabary

Ethnic groups in Guinea
Ethnic groups in Liberia
Mandé people